The 2018 WTA Tour was the elite professional tennis circuit organised by the Women's Tennis Association (WTA) for the  2018 tennis season. The 2018 WTA Tour calendar comprises the Grand Slam tournaments, supervised by the International Tennis Federation (ITF); the WTA Premier tournaments (Premier Mandatory, Premier 5, and regular Premier); the WTA International tournaments; the Fed Cup (organized by the ITF) and the year-end championships (the WTA Tour Championships and the WTA Elite Trophy). Also included in the 2018 calendar is the Hopman Cup, which is organized by the ITF and does not distribute ranking points.

Schedule 
This is the complete schedule of events on the 2018 calendar, with player progression documented from the quarterfinals stage.
Key

January

February

March

April

May

June

July

August

September

October

November

Statistical information
These tables present the number of singles (S), doubles (D), and mixed doubles (X) titles won by each player and each nation during the season, within all the tournament categories of the 2018 WTA Tour: the Grand Slam tournaments, the year-end championships (the WTA Tour Championships and the WTA Elite Trophy), the WTA Premier tournaments (Premier Mandatory, Premier 5, and regular Premier), and the WTA International tournaments. The players/nations are sorted by:

 total number of titles (a doubles title won by two players representing the same nation counts as only one win for the nation);
 cumulated importance of those titles (one Grand Slam win equalling two Premier Mandatory/Premier 5 wins, one year-end championships win equalling one-and-a-half Premier Mandatory/Premier 5 win, one Premier Mandatory/Premier 5 win equalling two Premier wins, one Premier win equalling two International wins);
 a singles > doubles > mixed doubles hierarchy;
 alphabetical order (by family names for players).

Key

Titles won by player

Titles won by nation

Titles information
The following players won their first main circuit title in singles, doubles, or mixed doubles:
Singles
 Naomi Osaka – Indian Wells (draw)
 Aleksandra Krunić – Rosmalen (draw)
 Tatjana Maria – Mallorca (draw)
 Olga Danilović – Moscow International (draw)
 Wang Qiang – Nanchang (draw)
 Mihaela Buzărnescu – San Jose (draw)
 Aryna Sabalenka – New Haven (draw)
 Dayana Yastremska – Hong Kong (draw)
Doubles
 Simona Halep – Shenzhen (draw)
 Bibiane Schoofs – Auckland (draw)
 Georgina García Pérez – Budapest (draw)
 Fanny Stollár – Budapest (draw)
 Naomi Broady – Monterrey (draw)
 Sara Sorribes Tormo – Monterrey (draw)
 Irina Khromacheva – Bogotá (draw)
 Anna Blinkova – Rabat (draw)
 Mihaela Buzărnescu – Strasbourg (draw)
 Alexa Guarachi – Gstaad (draw)
 Desirae Krawczyk – Gstaad (draw)
 Anastasia Potapova – Moscow International (draw)
 Choi Ji-hee – Seoul (draw)
 Han Na-lae – Seoul (draw)
 Olga Danilović – Tashkent (draw)
 Tamara Zidanšek – Tashkent (draw)
 Greet Minnen – Luxembourg City (draw)
 Alison Van Uytvanck – Luxembourg City (draw)
Mixed doubles
 Latisha Chan – French Open (draw)
 Nicole Melichar – Wimbledon (draw)

The following players defended a main circuit title in singles, doubles, or mixed doubles:
Singles
 Elise Mertens – Hobart (draw)
 Elina Svitolina – Dubai (draw), Rome (draw)
 Lesia Tsurenko – Acapulco (draw)
 Petra Kvitová – Birmingham (draw)
Doubles
 Raquel Atawo – Stuttgart (draw)
 Květa Peschke – Prague (draw)
 Irina-Camelia Begu – Bucharest (draw)
 Jiang Xinyu – Nanchang (draw)
 Tang Qianhui – Nanchang (draw)
 Johanna Larsson – Linz (draw)
 Tímea Babos – WTA Finals (draw)

Best ranking
The following players achieved their career high ranking in this season inside top 50 (in bold the players who entered the top 10 for the first time):
Singles

Doubles

WTA rankings
These are the WTA rankings of the top 20 singles players, doubles players, and the top 10 doubles teams on the WTA Tour, at the current date of the 2018 season.

Singles

Number 1 ranking

Doubles

Number 1 ranking

Prize money leaders

Statistics leaders

Points distribution

S = singles players, D = doubles teams, Q = qualification players.
* Assumes undefeated Round Robin match record.

WTA fan polls

Player of the month

Breakthrough of the month

Shot of the month

Retirements
Following is a list of notable players (winners of a main tour title, and/or part of the WTA rankings top 100 [singles] or top 100 [doubles] for at least one week) who announced their retirement from professional tennis, became inactive (after not playing for more than 52 weeks), or were permanently banned from playing, during the 2018 season:

 Annika Beck (born 16 February 1994 in Gießen, Germany) joined the professional tour in 2009 and reached a career-high ranking of no. 37 in singles and no. 84 in doubles. She won two singles titles and one doubles title on the WTA Tour, as well as seven singles titles on the ITF Women's Circuit. After having not played since October 2017 (2017 ITF Poitiers) due to ongoing injuries, Beck decided to end her tennis career in October 2018 in favour of academic pursuits.
 Eva Birnerová (born 14 August 1984 in Duchcov, Czechoslovakia, (modern day Czech Republic)) joined the professional tour in 2002 and reached a career-high ranking of no. 59 in singles and no. 52 in doubles. She reached one WTA singles final in Tashkent in 2011. She also won three doubles titles on the WTA Tour, as well as eight singles titles on the ITF Women's Circuit. After having not played in over four years, Birnerová decided to retire in November 2018.
 Chuang Chia-jung (born 10 January 1985 in Kaohsiung, Taiwan) joined the professional tour in 2001 and reached a career-high ranking of no. 177 in singles and no. 5 in doubles. Partnering Latisha Chan, Chuang reached the final of the 2007 Australian Open and the 2007 US Open women's doubles events. She also won twenty-two doubles titles on the WTA Tour, two doubles titles in the WTA 125K series, as well as ten singles titles on the ITF Women's Circuit. Chuang decided to retire in November 2018.
 Casey Dellacqua (born 11 February 1985 in Perth, Australia) joined the professional tour in 2002 and reached a career-high ranking of no. 26 in singles and no. 3 in doubles. She has reached seven grand slam doubles finals and won 7 doubles titles. She also won the 2011 French Open mixed doubles event alongside Scott Lipsky. Dellacqua played her last professional match in February during a deciding Fed Cup doubles tie.
 Marina Erakovic (born 6 March 1988 in Split, SFR Yugoslavia, (modern day Croatia)) joined the professional tour in 2005 and reached a career-high ranking of no. 39 in singles and no. 25 in doubles. She won 1 WTA Singles title in Memphis in 2013, along with 8 WTA doubles titles. She enjoyed more success at Grand Slam level in doubles, reaching the semi-finals of Wimbledon in 2011, as well as the quarterfinals at the US Open in 2008 and the French Open in 2013 and 2014. She was plagued by injury throughout her career and, after missing the entirety of the 2018 season with a back injury, she announced her retirement in December 2018.
 Bojana Jovanovski Petrović (born 31 December 1991 in Belgrade, Serbia) joined the professional tour in 2006 and reached a career-high ranking of no. 32 in singles and no. 203 in doubles. She won 2 WTA Tour singles titles, as well as 1 WTA 125K Series Title in 2013 and 4 ITF singles titles. She was part of the Serbian team that finished runner-up to the Czech Republic at the 2012 Fed Cup. Jovanovski Petrović underwent surgery for a shoulder injury in 2016, and despite making a limited comeback on the ITF Circuit at the beginning of the season, she decided to end her career in November 2018.
 Karin Knapp (born 28 June 1987 in Bruneck, Italy) joined the professional tour in 2002 and reached a career-high ranking of no. 33 in singles and no. 49 in doubles. Knapp won 2 singles titles during her career. As a member of the Italian Fed Cup team, Knapp was part of the squad that won the title in 2013. After having not played tournaments since the previous year's Australian Open and due to a chronic knee injury, she announced her retirement in May 2018.
 Anabel Medina Garrigues (born 12 April 1982 in Valencia, Spain) joined the professional tour in 1998 and reached a career-high ranking of no. 16 in singles and no. 3 in doubles. Medina Garrigues won 11 singles titles and 28 doubles titles during her career. She won two Grand Slams titles at the 2008 and 2009 French Open and an olympics silver medal alongside partner Virginia Ruano Pascual also in 2008. Later in her career, she became part of Jeļena Ostapenko's coaching staff, coaching her to win the 2017 French Open singles title. She announced that the 2018 US Open would be her final tournament.
 Agnieszka Radwańska (born 6 March 1989 in Kraków, Poland) joined the professional tour in 2005 and reached a career-high ranking of no. 2 in singles and no. 16 in doubles. Radwańska won 20 singles titles and 2 doubles titles during her career. She reached the final of the 2012 Wimbledon singles event, becoming the first Polish woman in the Open era to reach a grand slam singles final. Her biggest title came at 2015 WTA Finals in Singapore where she again became the first Pole to lift the trophy. She also won the 2015 Hopman Cup with Jerzy Janowicz for her nation. Her other achievements include winning the WTA Fan Favourite Award six times and Shot of the Year five times. Radwańska announced her retirement on 14 November 2018 due to health issues.
 Virginie Razzano (born 12 May 1983 in Dijon, France) joined the professional tour in 1999 and reached a career-high ranking of no. 16 in singles and no. 82 in doubles. Razzano won two WTA singles titles, both in 2007, as well as 1 WTA doubles title and 5 ITF singles titles. She was, however, perhaps best known for being so far the only player to defeat Serena Williams in the first round of a Grand Slam singles tournament, namely the 2012 French Open. She announced her retirement in December 2018.
 Olga Savchuk (born 20 September 1987 in Makiivka, Soviet Union (modern day Ukraine)) joined the professional tour in 2004 and reached a career-high ranking of no. 79 in singles and no. 33 in doubles. Her greatest achievement in singles came at the 2006 Australian Open, reaching the third round as a qualifier. Savchuk was primarily a doubles specialist, winning 3 titles in her career, and reaching the quarterfinals of Roland Garros in 2017. She announced that the 2018 US Open would be her last tournament.
 Francesca Schiavone (born 23 June 1980 in Milan, Italy) joined the professional tour in 1998 and reached a career-high ranking of no. 4 in singles and no. 8 in doubles. Schiavone won 8 singles titles and 7 doubles titles during her career, including her most prestigious, the 2010 French Open singles title. She also reached the French Open final in 2011 and made quarterfinal appearances in all the other three majors. Schiavone also reached the semifinals or better at all Grand Slam doubles events, finishing runner-up at the 2008 French Open alongside partner Casey Dellacqua. As a member of the Italian Fed Cup team, Schiavone was part of the squads that won the title in 2006, 2009 and 2010. Initially first planned to be retired after the 2017 season, she announced her retirement from tennis via a press conference during the 2018 US Open following her last tournament (Gstaad) in July.
 Patty Schnyder (born 14 December 1978 in Basel, Switzerland) joined the professional tour in 1996 and reached a career-high ranking of no. 7 in singles. Schnyder was a six-time Grand Slam quarterfinalist, and won 11 singles titles and 5 doubles titles during her career. After initially retiring in 2011, Schnyder returned to the tour in 2015, playing mostly on the ITF Women's Circuit and reaching a peak of number 139 in the rankings. Schnyder retired for a second and final time in November 2018.
 Patricia Maria Țig (born 27 July 1994 in Caransebeș, Romania) joined the professional tour in 2009 and reached a career-high ranking of no. 83 in singles and no. 155 in doubles. Țig reached 1 WTA singles final and 2 doubles finals during her career, losing all 3 of them. She also made first round appearances in all four majors. After a period of struggling with her performances in the second half of 2017 season, she decided to focus on her health, citing back pain as the main source of discomfort. Her last played tournament was the (Guangzhou Open) in September 2017. Țig became an inactive player on 24 September 2018 after not playing for 52 consecutive weeks.
 Roberta Vinci (born 18 February 1983 in Taranto, Italy) joined the professional tour in 1999 and reached a career-high ranking of no. 7 in singles and no. 1 in doubles. Vinci won 10 singles titles and 25 doubles titles during her career. She reached the final of the 2015 US Open singles event and won five grand slams doubles titles alongside compatriot Sara Errani, with whom she completed the Career Grand Slam. As a member of the Italian Fed Cup team, Vinci was part of the four Italian title-winning squads in 2006, 2009, 2010 and 2013. Vinci announced that the 2018 Italian Open would be her final tournament.
 Aleksandra Wozniak (born 7 September 1987 in Montreal, Canada) joined the professional tour in 2005 and reached a career-high ranking of no. 21 in singles and no. 136 in doubles. Wozniak won one WTA singles title in Stanford in 2008, as well as 11 ITF singles titles. Wozniak struggled with injuries throughout most of her career, and had played predominantly on the ITF Circuit since 2015. She announced her retirement from tennis in December 2018 at the age of 31.

Comebacks
Following are notable players who will come back after retirements during the 2018 WTA Tour season:

 Marion Bartoli (born 2 October 1984 in Le Puy-en-Velay, France) joined the professional tour in 2000 and reached a career-high ranking of no. 7 in singles and no. 15 in doubles. Bartoli won 8 singles titles and 3 doubles titles during her career, with her final singles title being her most prestigious, at the 2013 Wimbledon Championships where she defeated Sabine Lisicki to claim her only grand slam title. In addition, she reached the final of Wimbledon in 2007 where she lost to Venus Williams, and also reached the quarterfinals or better at each of the other three majors. Bartoli announced her retirement in August 2013 after the Cincinnati Open. In December 2017 she announced that she would return to the professional tennis tour in 2018. Bartoli was awarded a wildcard at the 2018 Mexican Open but withdrew before the tournament stating that she was injured and that she hoped to be fully fit for the grass season. However, as a result of ongoing injuries, Bartoli decided to abandon her comeback attempt in June.
 Rebecca Marino (born 16 December 1990 in Toronto, Canada) joined the professional tour in 2008 and reached a career-high ranking of no. 38 in singles. She reached her first and only tour-level final at the 2011 U.S. National Indoor Tennis Championships, losing to Magdaléna Rybáriková. She took a break from tennis to deal with mental and physical fatigue from February to August 2012. After playing some ITF and WTA tournaments, she decided in late February 2013 to take a second break from tennis with no timetable for her return. Marino started training again during the first week of September 2017 and decided to return to competition in October 2017, after being away from the game for nearly five years. She was scheduled to play an ITF 60K event in Saguenay but her comeback was delayed of three months due to ITF administrative regulations. She returned at an ITF 15K event in Antalya at the end of January 2018 and won the title in her first tournament back.

See also 

2018 WTA 125K series (lower tier WTA tour events)
2018 ATP World Tour
2018 ITF Women's Circuit
Women's Tennis Association
International Tennis Federation

References

External links 
Women's Tennis Association (WTA) official website
International Tennis Federation (ITF) official website

 
WTA Tour seasons
Wta Tour